The Other Woman is a 1976 Play For Today which aired January 6, 1976, written by Watson Gould and directed by Michael Simpson.

Filmed on a small budget in June 1975, it features Jane Lapotaire, Lynne Frederick, and Michael Gambon.

The plot revolves around the life of Kim (Lapotaire), a custodian/artist and self identified queer with a turbulent upbringing. She meets 17 year old Nikki (Frederick), a closeted, sexually fluid girl who came from a seemingly perfect background. As their relationship progresses, Kim discovers the problems Nikki faced despite her privileged upbringing, and her obligation to a pre-arranged heterosexual marriage.

The episode received mostly positive reviews from critics, but generated some mild controversy for its frank and cliché depiction of lesbian stereotypes. The brief onscreen kiss between Jane Lapotaire and Lynne Frederick was also met with some criticism from older and more conservative audiences. Frederick and Lapotaire, both supporters of LGBT rights, were unapologetic about the controversy and stood by their performances.

Cast
Jane Lapotaire as Kim
Lynne Frederick as Niki
Michael Gambon as Robin
Rosalind Adams as Rose
Eve Pearce as Louise
Benedict Taylor as Ben
Barbara Atkinson as Aunt Darnley
Leon Sinden as Miles Darnley
John Joyce as Barman

External links

References

Play for Today